Fabio Crotta (born 4 September 1979) is a Swiss equestrian. He competed in two events at the 2004 Summer Olympics.

References

External links
 

1979 births
Living people
Swiss male equestrians
Olympic equestrians of Switzerland
Equestrians at the 2004 Summer Olympics
People from Locarno
Sportspeople from Ticino